Fumonisin B2 is a fumonisin mycotoxin produced by the fungi Fusarium verticillioides (formerly Fusarium moniliforme) and Aspergillus niger.

It is a structural analog of fumonisin B3, while it is lacking one hydroxy group compared to fumonisin B1.

Fumonisin B2 is more cytotoxic than fumonisin B1. Fumonisin B2 inhibits sphingosine acyltransferase.

Fumonisin B2 and other fumonisins frequently contaminate maize and other crops, while recently it has been shown using LC–MS/MS that FB2 can contaminate coffee beans as well.

References 

Mycotoxins
Enzyme inhibitors